THE PLAZA Seoul, Autograph Collection is situated in the heart of Seoul, to the south of Seoul Plaza.

General Information
THE PLAZA Seoul, Autograph Collection (Hangul: 더 플라자 호텔 서울, 오토그래프컬렉션 ) is a luxury boutique hotel chain owned and operated by a South Korean hospitality subsidiary Hanwha Hotel & Resort. It is located in So gong-ro 119, Jung-gu, Seoul, where the historical buildings such as Deoksugung Palace, Gyeongbokgung Palace is located. Also it is within walking distance to major attractions such as Jungdong, Gwanghwamun, Seoul Station, Seoul Plaza, Myeongdong and Insa-dong. It is also known as a business hotel in a location where domestic and foreign financial institutions and large corporations are concentrated. Since January 2018, it gained a partnership with Marriott International's luxury lifestyle brand 'Autograph Collection' in Korea.

History 
THE PLAZA was opened in October 1976 under the name "Seoul Plaza Hotel" and reopened in November 2010 as a luxury boutique hotel. The renovation of the Plaza was the first and largest full-scale business operation in the hotel industry, including front-facing, all rooms, food service, and lobby. The construction period took six months from May 2010 and the total construction cost is about 80 billion won. Uniquely, the Plaza Hotel distinguishes itself from the others by designing all the interior elements, including the exterior of the hotel, all the rooms and lobby exclusively with the Italian designer Guido Ciompi.

Facilities 
THE PLAZA Seoul Hotel has 408 rooms, four restaurants offering international food, nine banquet halls that can serve as a venue for diverse events, and other facilities including a fitness center and spa.

Awards 

 In 2011, The Plaza was ranked No 1. from the Expedia Japan in Korea's Best Hotels after surveying facilities, location, breakfast, service and rate satisfaction.

 Selected as one of "The Best of Asia's Best Customer-Oriented, State-of-the-Art Hotel 10" by The Nation, a memorable weekly magazine. (link)
 In 2011, CNNGo, the Asian Culture Travel Information website, selected The Plaza as one of the top hotels in the top 7 hotels in Asia
 Selected as "Traveler's Choice Top 25 Hotel" of Trip Advisor for the 4th consecutive year since 2012 as the world's largest hotel
 In 2013, 'Smart Travel Asia', the leading online travel magazine, selected The Plaza as 'Best Business Hotel in Asia 25'
 Annually selected as Top10 luxury hotel category hosted by Global Traveler since 2016
 In 2017, The Plaza was awarded as the “City Hotel” and the “Large Hotel (over 400 rooms)” at the International Hotel Awards, for the first Korean hotel

References

Jung District, Seoul
South Korean brands
Hotels in Seoul
Hotels established in 1976
Hotel buildings completed in 1976